Tal-Għoqod is one of the subdivisions of Swieqi, Malta.

Geography of Malta
St. Julian's, Malta